was a town located in Hioki District, Kagoshima Prefecture, Japan.

As of 2003, the town had an estimated population of 7,088 and the density of 224.59 persons per km². The total area was 31.56 km².

On October 11, 2005, Ichiki, along with the city of Kushikino, was merged to create the city of Ichikikushikino and no longer exists as an independent municipality.

External links
 Official website of Ichikikushikino 

Dissolved municipalities of Kagoshima Prefecture